Anolis datzorum is a species of lizard in the family Dactyloidae. The species is native to Central America.

Etymology
The specific name, datzorum (genitive plural), is in honor of German philanthropists Erika Datz and her brother Walter Datz for their support of biodiversity research.

Geographic range
A. datzorum is found in Costa Rica and Panama.

Habitat

Description
It has relatively short back legs, no enlarged middorsal scales, keeled ventral scales at midbody, a white to yellowish dewlap in males, and an overall greenish coloration.

Behavior
A. datzorum is terrestrial and semiarboreal.

Reproduction
A. datzorum is oviparous.

References

Further reading
Köhler G, Ponce M, Sunyer J, Batista A (2007). "Four New Species of Anoles (Genus Anolis) from the Serranía de Tabasará, West-Central Panama (Squamata: Polychrotidae)". Herpetologica 63 (3): 375–391. (Anolis datzorum, new species).
Köhler G, Vargas J (2010). "Anolis datzorum Köhler, Ponce, Sunyer & Batista, 2007, an addition to the known herpetofauna of Costa Rica". Herpetozoa 23 (1/2): 95–98.
Lotzkat S, Köhler J, Hertz A, Köhler G (2010). "Morphology and colouration of male Anolis datzorum (Squamata: Polychrotidae)". Salamandra 46 (1): 48–52.

Anoles
Reptiles of Costa Rica
Reptiles of Panama
Reptiles described in 2007
Taxa named by Gunther Köhler